Zoran Matić OAM (born 25 December 1944) is a former football (soccer) coach.

Biography

Playing career
After arriving in Adelaide 1973 from Yugoslavia Matić played for Beograd Woodville (White City) before moving to Adelaide City. While playing for Adelaide City he represented the State of South Australia four times.

Coaching career
Matić is best known for coaching Adelaide City in the Australian National Soccer League. He coached Adelaide City to three championships (1986, 1991/1992 and 1993/1994) and was the first NSL coach to have won 200 matches. Matić was NSL coach of the year for the 1990/1991 and 1994/1995 seasons. Matić is a member of the Football Federation Australia Football Hall of Fame and the Football Federation of South Australia Hall of Fame.

Retirement
After retiring from coaching Matić began working in the construction industry. In 2006 as a result of an industrial accident involving a six-metre fall from a roof, Matić was hospitalised with multiple injuries including a broken neck, broken arm, shattered knee cap and facial injuries.

References

External links
 Oz Football profile

1944 births
Living people
Sportspeople from Adelaide
Australian people of Serbian descent
Serbian footballers
Australian soccer players
National Soccer League (Australia) players
Adelaide City FC players
Australian soccer coaches
FK Beograd (Australia) players
Association football defenders